The Apostolic Administration of Estonia is a Latin, territorial Catholic circonscription (ecclesiastical jurisdiction) that covers the entire country of Estonia.

It is an apostolic administration (quasi-diocesan jurisdiction) of the Latin Roman Catholic church in Estonia, hence is exempt (i.e. directly subject to the Holy See, not part of any ecclesiastical province) and has its cathedral episcopal see, the St. Peter and St. Paul's Cathedral, in the national capital Tallinn.
 
The post of apostolic administrator has often been held by titular archbishops, combining it with papal diplomatic posts in Estonia, Latvia and Lithuania.

History 
In 1918, when Estonia gained independence, its citizens had complete freedom of religion. The Holy See recognized Estonia on 10 October 1921. The Apostolic Administration of Estonia was established on November 1, 1924, on territory split off from the Roman Catholic Archdiocese of Riga (in the neighboring Baltic country Latvia).

The see remained vacant during most of the period when Estonia was occupied and annexed into the USSR after the death of Bishop Eduard Profittlich in 1942 because of the suppression of the Church by Soviet communist authorities.
 
Since 1992, after Estonia's post-communist independence, apostolic administrators are once again appointed. It enjoyed a papal visit in September 1993 from Pope John Paul II.

Apostolic Administrators of Estonia 
 Antonino Zecchini, Jesuits (S.J.), Titular Archbishop of Myra (1924.11.01 – 1931.05.11), Apostolic Delegate to Lithuania (1922.10.25 – 1927), Apostolic Internuncio to Latvia (1926.04.14 – 1935.03.07), Apostolic Delegate to Estonia (1927 – 1932)
 Eduard Profittlich, S.J. (1931.05.11 – 1942.02.22)
 vacancy in Soviet era
 Justo Mullor García (1992.04.15 – 1997.04.02), Titular Archbishop of Emerita Augusta (1979.03.21 – 1994.07.28), Titular Archbishop of Bolsena (1994.07.28 – ...), Apostolic Nuncio to Estonia (1991.11.30 – 1997.04.02), to Latvia (1991.11.30 – 1997.04.02) and to Lithuania (1991.11.30 – 1997.04.02)
 Erwin Josef Ender (1997.08.09 – 2001.05.19), Titular Archbishop of Germania in Numidia (1990.03.15 – ...), Apostolic Nuncio to Estonia (1997.07.09 – 2001.05.19), to Latvia (1997.07.09 – 2001.05.19) and to Lithuania (1997.07.09 – 2001.05.19)
 Peter Stephan Zurbriggen (2001.11.15 – 2005.03.23), Titular Archbishop of Glastonbury (1993.11.13 – ...), Apostolic Nuncio to Estonia (2001.10.25 – 2009.01.14), to Latvia (2001.10.25 – 2009.01.14) and to Lithuania (2001.10.25 – 2009.01.14)
 Philippe Jean-Charles Jourdan (2005.04.01 – ...), Titular Bishop of Pertusa (2005.04.01 – ...)

See also
Immaculate Conception Church, Tartu

References

Source and external links 
 GigaCatholic, with incumbent biography links

Apostolic administrations
Roman Catholic dioceses in Europe
Catholic Church in Estonia
Christian organizations established in 1924